National Institute of Laboratory Medicine & Referral Centre (NILMRC) is a state run academic institute for laboratory medicine in Agargaon, Dhaka.


History 
The project of the institute was approved by the ECNEC in June 2010. The 12-storey structure was completed in 2017. The initial budget of the project was Tk 138.14 crore, which has been increased by 41 percent to Tk 194.32 crore. Prime minister Sheikh Hasina inaugurated the institute  on 31 October 2018. But the institute was permitted to run from 2 December 2019.

Prof. Dr. Abul Khair Mohammad Shamsuzzaman served as the first director of the institute. On 24 April 2021, the head of the institute, Professor Dr A. K. M. Shamsuzzaman, died from COVID-19 complications.

Facilities 
Amid COVID-19 pandemic in Bangladesh, the institute is primarily active as a test centre for COVID-19.

References 

Hospitals in Dhaka
Medical education in Bangladesh
Medical and health organisations based in Bangladesh
Organisations based in Dhaka
Pathology organizations